Stigen (also known as Østre Lurøya or Eastern Lurøya) is an island in Lurøy Municipality in Nordland county, Norway. The  island lies immediately east of the island of Lurøya and northeast of the island of Onøya. The island has a population of 5 (in 2017). There are no road connections to the island.

See also
List of islands of Norway

References

Lurøy
Islands of Nordland